Oakman is an unincorporated community in Gordon County, in the U.S. state of Georgia.

History
A post office called Oakman has been in operation since 1908. The community was named for the "oak man", the nickname of a local lumber dealer. The Georgia General Assembly incorporated Oakman in 1939; the town's municipal charter was repealed in 1995.

References

Former municipalities in Georgia (U.S. state)
Unincorporated communities in Gordon County, Georgia
Unincorporated communities in Georgia (U.S. state)
Populated places disestablished in 1995